Judo at the 2007 Southeast Asian Games was held in the Gymnasium at Rajamangala University of Technology Isan, Nakhon Ratchasima, Thailand.

Medal tally

Medalists

Kata

Men

Women

External links
Southeast Asian Games Official Results

2007 Southeast Asian Games events
2007
Asian Games, Southeast
2007 Asian Games, Southeast